General elections were held in Niger in 1999; the first-round of the presidential elections was held on 17 October, with a run-off held alongside National Assembly elections on 24 November. The elections followed a coup d'état on 9 April, in which Ibrahim Baré Maïnassara, who had led an earlier coup in January 1996 and won disputed presidential elections, was assassinated. Coup leader Daouda Mallam Wanké initiated a transitional period that concluded with the victory of Mamadou Tandja, the candidate of the National Movement for the Development of Society (MNSD), over Mahamadou Issoufou, the candidate of the Nigerien Party for Democracy and Socialism (PNDS), in the run-off. The vote for the first National Assembly of the Fifth Republic, which had originally been scheduled for October, but delayed in August, also saw a victory for the MNSD, which won 38 of the 83 seats. It formed a coalition with the Democratic and Social Convention in order to gain a majority in the Assembly.

Background
Following the April 1999 coup, Wanké called for new presidential and parliamentary elections late in the year and barred the participation of candidates from the military.  The elections were overseen and organised by a sixty-member Independent National Election Commission, appointed by the military government with representatives from political parties and civil society groups on 27 May 1999.

A new constitution was approved by a referendum held on 18 July 1999 and promulgated 8 August. The elections were originally scheduled for 7 October 1999, but were delayed in August 1999.

Presidential candidates
Eight candidates sought to run in the presidential elections, including two rival candidates from the Rally for Democracy and Progress-Jama'a (RDP), which had been the ruling party under Maïnassara; Hamid Algabid and Amadou Cissé. It was left to the Court of State to decide which of these two candidates could run. On 3 September the Court released its list of approved candidates; seven were approved, including Algabid, while Cissé's candidacy was rejected.

Candidates eliminated in the first round sought to influence the outcome of the second round by endorsing one of the two remaining candidates; Djermakoye announced his support for Issoufou on 4 November, Ousmane announced his support for Tandja on 5 November, and Algabid and Djibo announced their support for Issoufou on 6 November (although some members of the RDP objected to Algabid's support for Issoufou and backed Tandja instead on 7 November).

Results

President

National Assembly

Aftermath
The new government was seated on 1 January 2000, and operated under the Constitution of 1999.

References

Presidential elections in Niger
1999 in Niger
Niger
Elections in Niger
Election and referendum articles with incomplete results